The 2007–08 Bowling Green Falcons men's basketball team was an NCAA Division I college basketball team competing in the Mid-American Conference.

Preseason
On April 4, 2007, Bowling Green State University announced Louis Orr as the program's 15th head coach, replacing Dan Dakich who left BG to become an assistant under Kelvin Sampson at Indiana.  Louis Orr joined the Falcons after five years at Seton Hall, where he compiled an 80–69 record and led the Pirates to two NCAA tournament appearances.  Entering the 2007–08 season, Bowling Green was picked to finish sixth in the MAC East division by the MAC News Media Association.

Coaching staff
 Louis Orr – Head coach
 LaMonta Stone – Assistant coach
 George Jackson – Assistant coach
 Andy Moore – Assistant coach
 Rick Palmer – Director of Basketball Operations

Roster

Starters are indicated in bold

Schedule

|-
!colspan=9 style=| Exhibition

|-
!colspan=9 style=| Regular season

|-
!colspan=9 style=| MAC tournament

Awards

Mid-American Conference Player of the Week
 Chris Knight, week 1
 Joe Jakubowski, week 17

References

Bowling Green Falcons
Bowling Green Falcons men's basketball seasons